Caisse de dépôt et placement du Québec (CDPQ) is an institutional investor that manages several public and parapublic pension plans and insurance programs in Quebec. CDPQ was founded in 1965 by an act of the National Assembly, under the government of Jean Lesage. It is the second-largest pension fund in Canada, after the Canada Pension Plan Investment Board. As of December 31, 2022, CDPQ managed assets of C$402 billion, invested in Canada and elsewhere. CDPQ is headquartered in Quebec City at the Price building and has its main business office in Montreal at Édifice Jacques-Parizeau.

History

The Caisse de dépôt et placement du Québec was established on July 15, 1965, by an Act of Québec's National Assembly to manage the funds of the Quebec Pension Plan, a public pension plan also created by the Québec government. In the years following, CDPQ was entrusted with managing the funds of other public pension and insurance plans: the Supplemental Pension Plan for Employees of the Québec Construction Industry (1970), the Government and Public Employees Retirement Plan (RREGOP) (1973), the Pension Plan of Management Personnel (PPMP) (1973) and the Fonds de la santé et de la sécurité du travail ( "Occupational Health and Safety Fund") (1973).

CDPQ initially focused on bonds before entering the Canadian stock market in 1967. It then created its private equity portfolio (1971), investing in Québec companies. Since 1974, it has been managing the largest Canadian equity portfolio in the country.

Between 1975 and 1984, CDPQ adopted new investment guidelines, placing greater emphasis on equity and entering the real estate market. It acquired its first office building and its first shares listed on foreign exchanges (1983). In 1984, it made its first foreign private equity investment. In 1978, another government body, the Fonds d'assurance automobile du Québec, entrusted CDPQ with the management of its funds.

In 1989, CDPQ acquired Ivanhoe Inc., the real estate arm of Steinberg's grocery store chain, consisting mainly of shopping centres, and diversified its real estate portfolio with investments abroad. In 1994, CDPQ began to manage the funds of another government institution, namely, the Retirement Plans Sinking Fund. Total assets under management reached $28 billion CAD in 1986.

In 1996, CDPQ's Real Estate group was the leading real estate owner in Québec and the second largest in Canada. The following year, legislative changes allowed CDPQ to invest 70% of its portfolio in shares, compared to a maximum of 40% prior to that. Since 2003, CDPQ has received the best short- and long-term credit ratings issued by the major credit rating agencies: Moody's Investors Service (Moody's), Standard and Poor's (S&P), and Dominion Bond Rating Service (DBRS).

In 2005 and 2006, CDPQ made its first major infrastructure acquisitions by investing in foreign airports. The next year, with partners, it purchased the Legacy Hotels Real Estate Investment Trust (REIT), owner of the prestigious Château Frontenac in Québec City. In 2007, its results put CDPQ in the first quartile of large Canadian pension funds for the fourth consecutive year.

In 2008, CDPQ lost $39.8 billion and generated a minus-26-per-cent return, making it the worst in CDPQ's 43-year history (in 2002, CDPQ had suffered a minus-9.4-per-cent return, its second worst year). The 2008 annual report of CDPQ shows that no bonuses were paid for 2008. CDPQ subsequently undertook a major restructuring. CEO Henri-Paul Rousseau took the lead and negotiated the conversion of the ABCP into long-term bonds, and major players agreed to prevent a forced liquidation that would have resulted in losses of $20 billion CAD. The resulting Montréal Agreement was deemed success and the 2008 loss was almost completely recouped in subsequent years.

In the wake of the 2008 financial crisis CDPQ implemented a series of measures to maximize efficiency, focus on core competencies, and strengthen risk management to support its long-term performance.

In June 2015, the Québec National Assembly passed Bill 38 "An Act to allow the Caisse de dépôt et placement du Québec to carry out infrastructure projects". CDPQ thereafter created a new subsidiary dedicated to the development of infrastructure projects, CDPQ Infra. The bill was introduced under the government of Philippe Couillard to enable the execution, management and funding of major public infrastructure projects, in partnership with CDPQ. The Quebec government submitted two projects for CDPQ Infra's evaluation: a public transit system to be integrated to the future Champlain bridge, and a public transit system linking downtown Montreal, the Montréal–Pierre Elliott Trudeau International Airport and the West Island.

As of 2017, CDPQ has 41 depositors and is active on Canadian and international markets. CDPQ holds a diversified portfolio including fixed-income securities, publicly listed shares, real estate investments, and private equity. A shareholder in more than 4,000 companies in Québec, elsewhere in Canada, and around the world, CDPQ is internationally recognized as a leading institutional investor.

In September 2017, CDPQ partnered with the Montreal-based private equity firm Novacap to invest in payment processing firm Pivotal Payments.

On June 12, 2018, short-term space rental company Breather announced it has raised $60 million in equity financing in a funding round led by la Caisse de dépôt et placement du Québec, and Singapore-based firms Temasek and Ascendas-Singbridge.

On October 3, 2018, it was announced the travel-booking app Hopper raised a $100 million in venture funding round. Caisse de dépôt et placement du Québec, who had previously invested in the company invested again, accompanied by Brightspark Ventures, Investissement Québec, and BDC Capital IT Venture Fund.

On October 3, 2019, micro-mobility company Bird announced its series D funding led by Sequoia Capital and Caisse de dépôt et placement du Québec.

In 2020 developer Orsted sold a 50% stake in the Greater Changhua 1 Offshore Wind Farm to Caisse de depot et placement du Quebec and Cathay PE for $2.7 billion.

In a September 28, 2021 press release, the CDPQ announced their 2021 climate strategy, which included divesting the remaining $3.9 billion currently held in oil company assets, which represented 1% of CDPQ's investment portfolio, by 2022. According to the statement, the CDPQ was responding "to the markets, to science, and to the will of Quebecers who do not want their money to fuel the climate crisis."

Mandate and independence
In 2005, article 4 of CDPQ's founding statute was amended to make the institution's mandate explicit:

4.1. The mission of the Fund is to receive moneys on deposit as provided by law and manage them with a view to achieving optimal return on capital within the framework of depositors' investment policies while at the same time contributing to Québec's economic development.

In June 2015, the CDPQ statute was further amended to specify that CDPQ "acts with full independence in accordance with this Act."

Organization
CDPQ's board of directors can have up to 15 members, two-thirds of whom must be independent. It is composed of its chair, the president and CEO, depositor representatives, and independent members. The board is responsible for establishing CDPQ's main orientations and ensuring that CDPQ operates according to all legislative and regulatory requirements. The position of chairman of the board of directors is separate from that of president and chief executive officer.

The Québec government appoints members of the board of directors, upon consultation with the board.  CDPQ's board of directors has defined a profile of expertise and experience required for its independent directors.

The executive committee is composed of the president and CEO and the senior officers of CDPQ's various sectors.

Subsidiaries
CDPQ has three subsidiaries: Ivanhoé Cambridge, Otéra Capital and CDPQ Infra.

The headquarters for the subsidiaries are located in the Jacques-Parizeau building in Montreal.

Ivanhoé Cambridge

Ivanhoé Cambridge is the real estate subsidiary of CDPQ. The company aims to invest in real estate assets ranging from office space, shopping centres to multi-residential buildings. Some of the biggest projects for Ivanhoé Cambridge are CIBC Square in Toronto and Tours Duo in Paris.

Otéra Capital 
Otéra Capital is a balance sheet lender in commercial real estate debt in Canada.

CDPQ Infra
CDPQ Infra is a subsidiary of the CDPQ, dedicated to the development of infrastructures and their management.  At the time of its creation, CDPQ Infra was commissioned by the Couillard government with the evaluation of two public transport projects for Greater Montreal;
 a) A public transit system on the Samuel-de-Champlain Bridge
 b) A public transit system for the West Island (between downtown Montreal, Pierre-Elliot-Trudeau International Airport and the West Island).

On 22 April 2016, CDPQ Infra unveiled plans for a new public transportation project, the Réseau express métropolitain (REM).  As proposed, the REM will link downtown Montréal, the South Shore, the West Island (Sainte-Anne-de-Bellevue), the North Shore (Deux-Montagnes) and the airport through a unified, electrically powered and fully automated, 67-km light metro system. The new network represents an investment of approximately $5.5 billion, of which CDPQ Infra is willing to commit $3 billion as the majority shareholder.

On March 8, 2017, General Electric said it had agreed to sell GE Water for around US$3.4 billion to Suez Environnement in France and CDPQ.

Investments

Type
CDPQ's portfolio is divided into four main categories of assets:

 Fixed Income
 Bonds
 Estate Debt
 Short Term Investments
 Long Term Bonds
Inflation-Sensitive Investments
Real Estate
Infrastructure
Real Return Bonds
Equity
Global Quality Equity
Canadian Equity	
Emerging Markets Equity
U.S. Equity
EAFE Equity
Private Equity
Other Investments

Geographic diversification
Geographic exposure of the overall portfolio, based on the country where the main place of business of the company or issuer is located or, in the case of real estate, the geographic location of properties:

Main depositors

Controversy over private security investments 
CQDP has been criticized for investing in the private security industry. It became the main shareholder of Allied Universal and also invested in CAE Inc. The critics address the poor economic value of those choices. They also address the great social and ethical problems that surround this industry. The holding of Allied Universal by CQDP became more of a problem after the company acquired G4S, a firm which have been implied in many controversies that led most of public pension funds to desinvest from it. G4S holds parts of Policity Corporation, a company that operate Israel's National Police Academy. This participation in the training of Israeli's armed forces is highly criticized by BDS movement. The global ESG rating of G4S in 2019 was C-.

See also
 CPP Investment Board
 Public Sector Pension Investment Board

References

External links
 
 CDPQ Infra
 Otéra Capital
 Video prepared for CDPQ's 50th anniversary

Companies based in Quebec City
Crown corporations of Quebec
Public pension funds in Canada
Retirement in Canada
1965 establishments in Quebec